Treaty of Berlin may refer to:
 Treaty of Berlin (1715), an alliance between Hanover-Great Britain and Denmark in the Great Northern War
 Treaty of Berlin (1732), between Austria and Prussia, signed but not ratified by Russia
 Treaty of Berlin (1742), between Austria and Prussia
 Treaty of Berlin (1878), which recognized an autonomous Bulgarian principality and the independence of Romania, Serbia and Montenegro from the Ottoman Empire
 Treaty of Berlin (1885), which regulated European colonization and trade in Africa
 Treaty of Berlin (1889), which recognized the independence of Samoa
 Treaty of Berlin (1899), which resulted in the partition of Samoa between Germany and the United States
 Treaty of Berlin (1918), ended World War I between Germany and Finland
 Treaty of Berlin (1921), between the United States and Germany
 Treaty of Berlin (1926), between Germany and the Soviet Union